The Los Amigos River ("Friends River", Spanish: Río los Amigos) is a river that flows through the Amazon rainforest in the Madre de Dios Region in southeastern Peru. It is a tributary of the Madre de Dios River.

Gallery

See also 
 Amazon basin
 Los Amigos Biological Station

References 

Rivers of Peru
Rivers of Madre de Dios Region